The 1998–99 Scottish Premier League season (also known as the 1998–99 Bank of Scotland Scottish Premier League for sponsorship reasons from 11 March) was the inaugural season of Scottish Premier League football, the top division of Scottish football. It began on 1 August 1998 and concluded on 23 May 1999.

The league was made up of the twelve clubs that broke away from the Scottish Football League at the end of the 1997–98 season. Celtic went into the season as the defending Scottish champions, having won the 1997–98 Scottish Premier Division.

Rangers won the title with 3 matches still to play on 2 May 1999, after defeating Old Firm rivals Celtic 3–0 in controversial circumstances at Celtic Park. Three players were red-carded during the game and referee Hugh Dallas was struck by a coin thrown by a Celtic supporter and required treatment from paramedics on the field.

Teams
On 8 September 1997, the clubs in the Premier Division decided to split from the Scottish Football League and form a Scottish Premier League (SPL). This followed an earlier example in England, which came into force during the 1992–93 season. This decision was fuelled by a desire by the top clubs in Scotland to retain more of the revenue generated by the game. Originally, league sponsorship money was divided proportionally between clubs in all four divisions. After the SPL was formed, its clubs retained all of its commercial revenues except for an annual payment to the SFL and a parachute payment to relegated clubs.

The new league followed the same format as the previous season's Premier Division, with the ten clubs playing each other four times, twice at home and twice away. Hibernian were relegated to the First Division after finishing bottom of the 1997–98 Scottish Premier Division. They were replaced by Dundee, the champions of the previous season's First Division.

Stadia and locations

Personnel and kits

Managerial changes

Overview
The 1998–99 Scottish Premier League season ended in success for Rangers who, managed by Dutchman Dick Advocaat, won the title by six points from nearest rivals Celtic. Dunfermline Athletic were relegated after three seasons in the top division. As champions, Rangers qualified for the Champions League while Celtic were joined by St Johnstone in qualifying for the UEFA Cup. Fourth placed Kilmarnock also gained a UEFA Cup place via the UEFA Fair Play ranking.

The season began on 1 August 1998 with the first SPL goal scored by Aberdeen's Eoin Jess as they defeated newly promoted Dundee 2–0 at Dens Park. Also on the first day of the season, Craig Burley scored the SPL's first hat-trick as defending champions Celtic defeated Dunfermline Athletic  5–0 at Celtic Park.

1998–99 saw the introduction of a three-week break during January, which was well received by both players and managers. In its inaugural year, the SPL was broadcast to over 120 countries worldwide, while attendances increased and more money was invested in youth development than ever before. A new Scottish transfer record was also set as Rangers paid Fiorentina £5.5m for former Manchester United and Everton winger Andrei Kanchelskis.

Rangers clinched the SPL title on 2 May 1999 by beating Old Firm-rivals Celtic 3–0 at Celtic Park. Three players were red-carded during the game and referee Hugh Dallas was struck by a coin thrown by a Celtic supporter and required treatment from paramedics on the field.

Dunfermline Athletic were relegated to the Scottish First Division on 8 May 1999 after a 2–1 defeat to Celtic at East End Park.

League table

Results

Matches 1–18
During matches 1–18 each team plays every other team twice (home and away).

Matches 19–36
During matches 19–36 each team plays every other team a further two times (home and away).

Top scorers

Source: SPL official website

Attendances
The average attendances for SPL clubs during the 1998–99 season are shown below:

Source: SPL official website

References

Scottish Premier League seasons
1
Scot